Pukkattupady is a suburb of the City of Kochi, in Ernakulam District, Kerala, India. It is in intersection of major bus route from Aluva Town via F.A.C.T and BPCL to Thrippunithura and Kolenchery via Kizhakkambalam and the routes from Perumbavoor to Ernakulam via NPOL or Edappally.

It comes under Edathala and Kizhakkambalam Grama Panchayaths. It belongs to Central Kerala Division.

The town is 10 kilometres towards East from District headquarters Kakkanad and 216 km from State capital Thiruvananthapuram. It is 11 kilometres from Edapally and 10 kilometres from Aluva Metro station. Being a suburb in City of Kochi, the greatest advantage of Pukkatupady is that the distance between the main centres of Kochi city and Pukkatupady are almost same.

To its south is Pazhanganad and Kizhakkambalam, east is Oorakkad and Thamarachal, south west is Kakkanad and to north is South Vazhakulam and Malayidomthuruth, north west is Choondy.

Connectivity

By Road 
Pukkattupady is well connected by roads to all major centers of Ernakulam district, including Perumbavoor, Aluva and Edappally. Pukkattupady is connected by private buses which ply regularly. 6.4 km to Wonderla Amusement Park from Pukatupady Smart city is 9 km from Pukkatupady Infopark Kochi is 9 km from Pukkatupady

By Air 
Pukkattupady is located about 21 kilometers away from the nearest airport, Cochin International Airport.

By Rail 
The Aluva Railway Station is just 8 kilometers and Kalamassery Railway Station is 11 km and Edappally Railway Station is just 13 km from Pukkattupady.

Organizations 

Pukkattupady Merchant Association is the association of merchants of Pukkattupady established in 1990 by Thuruthummel Group Premier T V Mathai Thuruthummel.

Pukkattupady Residents Association is the largest organization centered in Pukkattupady with more than 5000 members.

The Lions Clubs International of Pukkattupady organization includes rich and effluent families in Pukkattupady. Initiated By T V Mathai Thuruthummel.

Vallathol Library Council maintains the second largest library in Kunnathunadu Taluk. Conducts Vallathol Smaraka Kalamathsaram, an inter school art and cultural fest.

Udayam Arts and Sports club is a club for youth established in the late 1990s and has more than 100 members. It conducts many charity activities.

Religious places 
 St Mary's Jacobite Valiyapally, Thamarachal

 Ambunadu Muslim jumamazjid
 Juma Mazjid Kunjattukara
 Kunjattukara Bhagavathi Temple
 Muruka Temple
 Paradtha Temple
 SreeKrishna Temple, Oorakkad
 St George Jacobite Church, Pukkattupady
 St Sebastians RC Church Ambunadu
 St. Augustine's Syro-Malabar Catholic Church, Pazhanganad
 St. Mary's Jacobite Syrian Church, Malayidomthuruth
 St. Thomas Jacobite Syrian Church, Oorakkadu
 St.John's Syro-Malabar Church, Pukkattupaddi
 Vettakorumagan Temple, Kalathil
 Sree Ramaswamy Temple, Pukkattupady

Hospitals 
 Samaritain Hospital, Pazhanganad
 Thaqdees Hospital at Pukkattupady
 Ayswarya Hospital

The Rajagiri Hospital is located just 4.3 km away from Pukkattupady.

References 

Cities and towns in Ernakulam district